Here to Stay is a studio album by American jazz trumpeter Freddie Hubbard recorded on December 27, 1962 but not released on the Blue Note label until 1976 as BN-LA 496-2. It features performances by Hubbard, Cedar Walton, Reggie Workman, Philly Joe Jones, and Wayne Shorter.

Reception
Norman Weinstein of All About Jazz commented "Another indication of Hubbard's well-seasoned taste on this session is revealed in using two of Cal Massey's most memorable compositions, "Father and Son" and "Assunta." Listen to the solos by Hubbard and Shorter on "Assunta" and ask yourself if they haven't slipped to a new phase of their growth, apart from Blakey's band at this juncture, that's more darkly introspective. I hope the album title is true of the recording's fate". Scott Yanow of AllMusic stated "Although that session ( four Hubbard compositions, one of Walton's songs, and Randy Weston's "Cry Me Not") is excellent, it is the full album of previously unreleased material from an all-star quintet that is of greatest interest".

Track listing
All compositions by Freddie Hubbard, except where indicated.
 "Philly Mignon" - 5:30
 "Father and Son" (Cal Massey) - 6:37
 "Body and Soul" (Frank Eyton, Johnny Green, Edward Heyman, Robert Sour) - 6:29
 "Nostrand and Fulton" - 7:09
 "Full Moon and Empty Arms" (Buddy Kaye, Ted Mossman) - 5:28
 "Assunta" (Massey) - 7:07

Personnel
 Freddie Hubbard - trumpet
 Wayne Shorter - tenor saxophone
 Cedar Walton - piano
 Reggie Workman - bass
 Philly Joe Jones - drums

References

1976 albums
Freddie Hubbard albums
Blue Note Records albums
Albums produced by Alfred Lion
Albums recorded at Van Gelder Studio